Taboo was a Eurodance group formed in Germany. It was created by producers Nico Dee-Brunetti and Piero Brunetti. They released one single, "I Dream of You Tonight (Bab Ba Ba Bab)". It peaked at number 92 on the German Singles Chart and reached number-one on the RPM Dance Chart in Canada.

Discography

Singles

References

German Eurodance groups
German dance music groups
German house music groups
Musical groups established in 1995